Marco Falchetto (born 22 December 1973) is an Austrian fencer. He competed in the foil events at the 1996 Summer Olympics.

References

External links
 

1973 births
Living people
Austrian male foil fencers
Olympic fencers of Austria
Fencers at the 1996 Summer Olympics
Fencers from Vienna